The first world record in the women's long jump was recognised by the Fédération Sportive Féminine Internationale (FSFI) in 1922. The FSFI was absorbed by the International Association of Athletics Federations in 1936.

Record progression

As of June 2009, the IAAF (and the FSFI before it) have ratified 36 world records in the event.

See also
 Men's long jump world record progression

References

Long jump
World records in athletic jumping
Long jump